Blue Eyed in the Red Room is the second solo studio album by Boom Bip. It was released through Lex Records on March 8, 2005. It features guest appearances from Gruff Rhys and Nina Nastasia.

Critical reception

At Metacritic, which assigns a weighted average score out of 100 to reviews from mainstream critics, the album received an average score of 75, based on 20 reviews, which indicated "generally favorable reviews".

Brian Howe of Pitchfork gave the album a 7.5 out of 10, describing it as "a restful wash of clean, simple lines, unfractured beats, and neon-tinted melodies." He added, "I'm sure the remixes of Blue Eyed in a Red Room will be profligate and terrific; but in this instance, the source material itself is well worth your while." Chet Betz of Cokemachineglow gave the album a rating of 66%, saying, "While not any real cause for concern amongst Boom Bip fans, Blue Eyed in the Red Room is not the masterpiece that they might be hoping for."

Track listing

Personnel
Credits adapted from liner notes.

 Boom Bip – music, mixing
 Gruff Rhys – lyrics (3), vocals (3)
 Nina Nastasia – lyrics (10), vocals (10)
 Marty Delafongio – vocal recording (3)
 Paul Bryan – vocal recording (10)
 Robert Curcio – mixing
 Noel Sommerville – engineering, mastering
 Ehquestionmark – artwork

References

External links
 

2005 albums
Boom Bip albums
Lex Records albums